Edmund Dana "Dick" Pierson (October 24, 1857 to July 20, 1922) was a Major League Baseball second baseman. In 3 career games, he had 1 hit in 9 at-bats. It is not known with what hand he batted, but he threw right-handed.

Pierson was born in Wilkes-Barre, Pennsylvania and died in Newark, New Jersey. His brother, Dave Pierson, also played baseball for the Cincinnati Reds.

External links
Baseball Reference.com page

1857 births
1922 deaths
New York Metropolitans players
Major League Baseball second basemen
Newark Domestics players
Baseball players from Pennsylvania
Sportspeople from Wilkes-Barre, Pennsylvania
19th-century baseball players